Fork Songs is an album by New Zealand band Tall Dwarfs released in 1991. Tracks 15 to 20 are bonus tracks on the CD, originally released in 1986 as Dogma EP.

Track listing
 "Dare To Tread"	
 "We Bleed Love"	
 "Wings"	
 "Skirl"	
 "Thought Disorder"	
 "Small Talk"	
 "Lowlands"	
 "Life Is Strange"
 "Daddy"	
 "All Is Fine"	
 "Two Humans"	
 "Oatmeal"	
 "Boys"	
 "Think Small"	
 "Lurlene Bayliss"	
 "Waltz Of The Good Husband"	
 "The Slide"	
 "Can't"	
 "Dog"	
 "Missed Again"

References

1990 albums
Tall Dwarfs albums
Flying Nun Records albums